Dallas Graded and High School, also known as the Church Street School, is a historic school building located at Dallas, Gaston County, North Carolina.  The main school building was built in 1923–1924, and is a two-story, seven bay, "T"-plan Classical Revival style red brick school.  It has a flat roof with parapet and features a three-bay porticoed entry pavilion.  It has an eight classroom addition built in 1951.

It was listed on the National Register of Historic Places in 2002.

References

School buildings on the National Register of Historic Places in North Carolina
Neoclassical architecture in North Carolina
School buildings completed in 1924
Buildings and structures in Gaston County, North Carolina
National Register of Historic Places in Gaston County, North Carolina
1924 establishments in North Carolina